Roger George Mills (born 11 February 1948 in Romford, Essex) is a male retired race walker from England.

Athletics career
Mills represented Great Britain at the 1980 Summer Olympics in Moscow, USSR. There he ended up in tenth place in the men's 20 km race, clocking 1:32.37,8.

He represented England in the 30 kilometres walk event, at the 1982 Commonwealth Games in Brisbane, Queensland, Australia.

Achievements

References

External links
 

1948 births
Living people
English male racewalkers
Olympic athletes of Great Britain
Athletes (track and field) at the 1980 Summer Olympics
Athletes (track and field) at the 1982 Commonwealth Games
People from Romford
European Athletics Championships medalists
Sportspeople from Essex
World Athletics Championships athletes for Great Britain
Commonwealth Games competitors for England